Lieutenant General Shahid Baig Mirza is the former Commander of V Corps in Karachi. A three stars rank general of Pakistan Army, he was appointed as the commander of the corps on 7 December 2016.

Early life
He was born into a military family of Mulhal Mughlan Chakwal District, he is the eldest of three brothers, all officers and sons of Lieutenant Colonel (retd) Abdul Haq and Zaib-un-Nisa.

Personal life
His youngest brother, Major Umar Baig Mirza, was martyred  in a helicopter crash while performing rescue operations on 15 October 2005, and his other brother Lieutenant Colonel Amer Baig Mirza was in the ISI and was martyred in the Lahore terrorist attack on 27 May 2009.

Military career
Then Major General Shahid Baig Mirza was the commandant of the Command and Staff College from January 2014 to May 2015. He was awarded the Hilal-i-Imtiaz on Pakistan Day, 23 March 2015 and was promoted to Lieutenant General in April 2015.

References

Pakistani generals
Recipients of Hilal-i-Imtiaz
Living people
Year of birth missing (living people)